The National Historic Oregon Trail Interpretive Center is a  interpretive center about the Oregon Trail located  northeast of Baker City, Oregon on Oregon Route 86 atop Flagstaff Hill. It is operated by the Bureau of Land Management in partnership with Trail Tenders  and the Oregon Trail Preservation Trust, and offers living history demonstrations, interpretive programs, exhibits, multi-media presentations, special events, and more than four miles (6 km) of interpretive trails.

Exhibit themes include area natural history, pre-emigrant travelers and explorers, Native Americans, pioneer life, the General Land Office and Bureau of Land Management, and the mining and settlement of Northeast Oregon.

History
The book Trail of a Dream by Dorthy Wooters chronicles that dream from the early planning stage in 1987 through funding and construction and, ultimately, opening day in 1992.

Key dates
March 1, 2001—The center re-opens to full-time operation after major structural retrofit.
May, 1992—National Historic Oregon Trail Interpretive Center opens

See also
National Historic Trails Interpretive Center

References

External links
 [https://www.oregontrail.blm.gov
 National Historic Oregon Trail Interpretive Center - official site

Oregon Trail
History museums in Oregon
American West museums in Oregon
Buildings and structures in Baker City, Oregon
Museums in Baker County, Oregon
Natural history museums in Oregon
1992 establishments in Oregon
Bureau of Land Management areas in Oregon